Centaur is a 2016 Kyrgyzstani drama film directed by Aktan Abdykalykov. It was screened in the Panorama section at the 67th Berlin International Film Festival and won the CICAE award. It was selected as the Kyrgyz entry for the Best Foreign Language Film at the 90th Academy Awards, but it was not nominated.

Plot
Outside Bishkek, a cinema projectionist named Centaur steals racehorses at night and sets them free.

Cast
 Aktan Abdykalykov as Centaur
 Nuraly Tursunkojoev as Nurberdi
 Zarema Asanalieva as Maripa
 Taalaikan Abazova as Sharapat
 Ilim Kalmuratov as Sadyr
 Bolot Tentimyshov as Karabay
 Maksat Mamyrkanov as Teit

See also
 List of submissions to the 90th Academy Awards for Best Foreign Language Film
 List of Kyrgyz submissions for the Academy Award for Best Foreign Language Film

References

External links
 

2016 films
2016 drama films
Kyrgyzstani drama films
Kyrgyz-language films